Smita Tambe is a Marathi and Hindi film, television and stage actor. She is known for her work in 72 Miles .

Early life 
Tambe was born in the Satara, Maharashtra. She was brought up in Pune, and moved to Mumbai to pursue a career in Marathi films and television. She was also pursuing a PhD in Marathi Loksahitya and Samaj.

Career 
She had a role in Jogwa in 2009, and her first lead role was in Akshay Kumar's Marathi movie 72 Miles-Ek Pravas. She also owns the production house Ringing Rain, which produced Saavat in 2019. Her upcoming projects include Hawa Badle Hassu, Sacred Games(Season 2) and Panga.

Filmography

Films

Television

Personal life 
Tambe married theatre artist Virendra Dwivedi in 2019.

References

External links
 
 

1983 births
Living people
Indian soap opera actresses
Actresses in Marathi cinema
Indian women comedians
Actresses in Marathi theatre
Marathi actors